The Archiv für Begriffsgeschichte ("Archives of conceptual history") is an annual peer-reviewed academic journal covering studies on concepts of the history of philosophy and science. It was established in 1955 by Erich Rothacker and the current editors-in-chief are Christian Bermes (University of Koblenz-Landau), Hubertus Busche (University of Hagen), and Michael Erler (University of Würzburg). Former editors include Hans-Georg Gadamer, Joachim Ritter, Karlfried Gründer, Ulrich Dierse, and Gunter Scholtz. Articles are published in German, with abstracts in English.

Abstracting and indexing
The journal is abstracted and indexed in Academic Search Premier, International Bibliography of Periodical Literature, L'Année philologique, Modern Language Association Database,  and the Philosopher's Index.

See also
 List of philosophy journals
 Conceptualism

References

External links

History of philosophy journals
German-language journals
Publications established in 1955
Conceptualism
1955 establishments in Germany